The 2015 Atlantic 10 men's basketball tournament was held March 11–15, 2015 at the Barclays Center in Brooklyn, New York. With Davidson joining the conference in July 2014, it was a 14-team tournament for the first time.

Seeds
All 14 Atlantic 10 schools participate in the tournament. Teams were seeded by the 2014–15 Atlantic 10 Conference season record. The top 10 teams received a first round bye and the top four teams received a double bye.

Teams were seeded by record within the conference, with a tiebreaker system to seed teams with identical conference records.

Schedule

*Game times in Eastern Time. #Rankings denote tournament seeding.

Bracket

See also
2015 Atlantic 10 women's basketball tournament

References

Atlantic 10 men's basketball tournament
2014–15 Atlantic 10 Conference men's basketball season
Basketball in New York City
College sports in New York City
Sports in Brooklyn
Sports competitions in New York City
Atlantic 10 men's basketball tournament
Atlantic 10 men's basketball tournament
2010s in Brooklyn
Prospect Heights, Brooklyn